"The Secret Garden (Sweet Seduction Suite)" is a song by Quincy Jones, featuring American R&B singers Al B. Sure!, James Ingram, El DeBarge, and Barry White.  It was released as a single from Jones's album, Back on the Block (1989), and peaked at number one on the Billboard Black Singles chart for one week in 1990. It also reached number 31 on the Billboard Hot 100, number 26 on the Adult Contemporary chart, and number 67 on the UK Singles Chart. "The Secret Garden (Sweet Seduction Suite)" was written by Jones, Rod Temperton, Siedah Garrett and DeBarge and produced by Jones.

Personnel
 El DeBarge – lead vocals, background vocals
 James Ingram – lead vocals
 Al B. Sure! – lead vocals, background vocals
 Barry White – lead vocals
 Teddy Pendergrass – background vocals
 Siedah Garrett – background vocals
 Bill Summers – hindewhu
 Steve Lukather – guitar
 Greg Phillinganes – Fender Rhodes electric piano
 Larry Williams – keyboards, synth programming
 Neil Stubenhaus – bass guitar
 John Robinson – drums
 Jerry Hey – arranger
 Quincy Jones – arranger
 Rod Temperton – arranger
 Bruce Swedien – recording engineer, mixing, kick & snare drums

Certifications

References

1990 songs
1990 singles
Quincy Jones songs
James Ingram songs
Barry White songs
Al B. Sure! songs
Songs written by Quincy Jones
Songs written by Rod Temperton
Songs written by Siedah Garrett
Songs written by El DeBarge
Song recordings produced by Quincy Jones
1990s ballads
Qwest Records singles
Contemporary R&B ballads